This is a list of notable people from the city of Utrecht, Netherlands.

Arts and entertainment  
Louis Andriessen - composer
Dick Bruna - writer, illustrator (Miffy children's books)
Gerald Clayton - jazz pianist
Gerti Daub - beauty pageant winner
Hubert de Blanck - pianist, composer, founder of the Cuban National Conservatory of Music
Hendrick de Keyser - architect and sculptor
Melchior d'Hondecoeter - painter
Sharon Doorson - musician
EliZe - singer
Ronald Giphart - author
Arthur Japin - novelist
Fred Kaps - magician, illusionist
Sylvia Kristel - actress and model
Fedde le Grand - musician (Put Your Hands Up 4 Detroit)
Robert Long - singer
Erhard Reuwich - fifteenth-century artist and illustrator
Gerrit Rietveld - designer, architect (De Stijl movement)
Wim Sonneveld  - comedian, singer
Dirk van der Burg - painter, watercolourist
Theo van Doesburg - painter, artist (De Stijl movement)
Herman van Veen - comedian, singer
Henk Westbroek - singer, DJ, local politician, bar owner
Antonius Wyngaerde - composer

Clergy 
Pope Adrian VI - head of the Catholic Church

Industry 
 Jeroen van der Veer - former CEO of Shell
 Paul Fentener van Vlissingen - former CEO of SHV Holdings

Military 
Karel Doorman - Rear Admiral; Commander of ABDA fleet during Battle of the Java Sea
Trijn van Leemput - local heroine of the Eighty Years' War
Olivier van Noort - mariner and explorer

Politics 
 Joba van den Berg - Christian Democratic Appeal MP
 Arjan El Fassed - GreenLeft MP
 Anton Reinhard Falck - politician and lawyer
 Tom van den Nieuwenhuijzen - GreenLeft MP

Royalty 
 Willem-Alexander of the Netherlands, the current King of the Netherlands

Science 
C.H.D. Buys Ballot - meteorologist, Buys Ballot law
Gerard 't Hooft - Nobel prize in Physics 1999

Sports 
Johan Aantjes - water polo player and coach
John Achterberg - former footballer and goalkeeping coach
Ibrahim Afellay - football player
Ismail Aissati - football player
Tessa Appeldoorn - rower
Jacques Brinkman - field hockey player
Det de Beus - field hockey player
Germaine de Randamie – kickboxer and mixed martial artist
Fedor den Hertog - cyclist
Rob Druppers - middle distance runner
Anton Geesink - judo champion
Zakaria Labyad - football player
Martha Laurijsen - rower
Hans Parrel - water polo player
Wesley Sneijder - football player
Patricia Stokkers - swimmer
Carole Thate - field hockey player
Jochem Uytdehaage - ice speed skater
Marco van Basten - coach and former football player
Hans van Breukelen - former football player
Diana van der Plaats - swimmer
Marieke van Drogenbroek - rower
Willem van Hanegem - football player
John van Loen - football player
Dafne Schippers - track and field
Wim van Spingelen - water polo player
Gerald Vanenburg - football player
Gerrit Wormgoor - water polo player
Jan Wouters - football player

Other
Maria van Pallaes (1587–1664), philanthropist

Fictional 
Dr. Strabismus (whom God preserve) of Utrecht - immortal uber eccentric scientist and inventor, created by J. B. Morton in his Beachcomber series. His  inventions included a leather grape, a revolving wheelbarrow, and a hollow glass walking stick for keeping very small flannel shirts in.

 
Utrecht